The 2005–2006 FINA Swimming World Cup was series of eight international short course swimming meets organized by FINA which took place from November 2005 through February 2006. The overall winners for the series were Ryk Neethling of South Africa (male) and Therese Alshammar of Sweden (female).

Meets

Event winners
WR denotes World Record
WC denotes World Cup Record

50 m freestyle

100 m freestyle

200 m freestyle

400 m freestyle

1500m (men)/800m (women) freestyle

50 m backstroke

100 m backstroke

200 m backstroke

50 m breaststroke

100 m breaststroke

200 m breaststroke

50 m butterfly

100 m butterfly

200 m butterfly

100 m individual medley

200 m individual medley

400 m individual medley

References

FINA Swimming World Cup
2005 in swimming
2006 in swimming